Falsapomecyna mourgliae is a species of beetle in the family Cerambycidae. It was described by Téocchi in 1988.

References

Desmiphorini
Beetles described in 1988